The Collingswood Public Schools is a comprehensive community public school district that serves students in pre-kindergarten through twelfth grade from Collingswood, in Camden County, New Jersey, United States.

As of the 2021–22 school year, the district, comprised of nine schools, had an enrollment of 2,264 students and 200.4 classroom teachers (on an FTE basis), for a student–teacher ratio of 11.3:1.

The district is classified by the New Jersey Department of Education as being in District Factor Group "FG", the fourth-highest of eight groupings. District Factor Groups organize districts statewide to allow comparison by common socioeconomic characteristics of the local districts. From lowest socioeconomic status to highest, the categories are A, B, CD, DE, FG, GH, I and J.

Students in ninth through twelfth grades from Woodlynne attend Collingswood High School as part of a sending/receiving relationship with the Woodlynne School District. Students in grades 6-12 from Oaklyn attend Collingswood's schools as part of a sending/receiving relationship with the Oaklyn Public School District.

Schools
Schools in the district (with 2021–22 enrollment data from the National Center for Education Statistics) are:
Preschool
Collingswood Preschool with 57 students at Penguin and 43 at Oaklyn in PreK
Elementary schools
James A. Garfield Elementary School with 131 students in grades K-5
Mark Wiltsey, Principal
Mark Newbie Elementary School with 138 students in grades K-5
Steven Smith, Principal
Thomas Sharp Elementary School with 189 students in grades PreK-5
Dr. Karen Principato, Principal
William P. Tatem Elementary School with 244 students in grades K-5
Brian Kulak, Principal
Zane North Elementary School with 149 students in grades K-5
Thomas Santo, Principal
Middle school
Collingswood Middle School with 526 students in grades 6-8
Dr. John McMullin, Principal
Michael Jefferson, Vice Principal
High school 
Collingswood High School with 777 students in grades 9-12
Dr. Michael Ostroff, Principal

Administration
Core members of the district's administration are:
Dr. Fredrick McDowell, Superintendent
Beth Ann Coleman, Business Administrator / Board Secretary
Reagan Kaiden President of the Collingswood Board of Education

Board of education
The district's board of education, comprised of nine elected members, sets policy and oversees the fiscal and educational operation of the district through its administration. As a Type II school district, the board's trustees are elected directly by voters to serve three-year terms of office on a staggered basis, with three seats up for election each year held (since 2012) as part of the November general election. The board appoints a superintendent to oversee the district's day-to-day operations and a business administrator to supervise the business functions of the district. Oaklyn and Woodlynne each have a representative appointed to serve on the Collingswood district board to represent the interests of their respective district.

Programs
On November 15, 1994, the International Educational Systems (IES) Language Foundation was scheduled to begin an afterschool language program for students of the Collingswood district in the 2nd through 6th grades. For a $36 ($ adjusted for inflation) monthly fee students could take Spanish or French classes. They were to be held for one hour once per week.

Controversy
The school district gained national and international media attention for calling the police on a 3rd grader, who allegedly made inappropriate remarks about brownies served at an end-of-year school party.  The incident has brought attention to a school district policy of involving armed law enforcement officers to deal with all school discipline matters including name calling, resulting in up to five police visits a day according to Superintendent Scott Oswald.  According to media reports, students are denied access to their parents and legal counsel during law enforcement interrogations, which take place within the school.

References

External links
Collingswood Public Schools
 
School Data for the Collingswood Public Schools, National Center for Education Statistics
Championship Collingswood Panther Marching Band

Collingswood, New Jersey
New Jersey District Factor Group FG
School districts in Camden County, New Jersey